Greatest Hits is a compilation album by the British band Steve Harley & Cockney Rebel, released by EMI in 1987.

Background
Greatest Hits was the first Steve Harley & Cockney Rebel compilation to be released by EMI since 1980's The Best of Steve Harley and Cockney Rebel. It would also be the band's first compilation to be released on CD. Upon release in October 1987, the compilation did not make an appearance on the UK chart.

The compilation was digitally re-mastered, and released by EMI on vinyl, CD and cassette, in the UK and Europe. The CD edition of the compilation featured extra tracks. The vinyl and cassette editions feature twelve tracks from 1973 to 1976, focusing on the commercial heyday of the band's two most commercially successful line-ups - Cockney Rebel (1973–74) and Steve Harley & Cockney Rebel (1974–77). The CD version featured three further tracks; "(Love) Compared with You", "Riding the Waves (For Virginia Woolf)" and "Freedom's Prisoner". The latter two Steve Harley solo tracks are taken from 1978's Hobo with a Grin and 1979's The Candidate respectively, and were therefore produced after the band's split in 1977.

Track listing
All songs written by Steve Harley except "Here Comes the Sun" by George Harrison and "Freedom's Prisoner" by Harley and Jimmy Horowitz.

LP/Cassette version

CD version

Critical reception

Upon release, Mark Sinker of New Musical Express reviewed the compilation and stated: "[Harley] was five years late on the eccentric cameo Englandisms that Bowie and the Kinks had defined and exhausted. He had a sillier speech defect than Ian Hunter, and a more absurdly elevated sense of rock's theatrical possibilities. He was camper than Queen could be, and far less forgiveable than Ferry. And still, for all that, he wrote a wicked little melodrama of a tune. The art-pomp of most of these songs has exactly the wistful tinge that Ray Davies had lost, by the early '70s. I don't suppose we noticed that. We were too busy thinking ourselves smart for knowing what he was on about, or hating him for not being real ROCK. I'm obviously going senile, but this is a brilliant record."

Donald A. Guarisco of AllMusic retrospectively wrote: "Of all the glam-rock acts to hit it big in England during the 1970s, Steve Harley & Cockney Rebel were second only to David Bowie himself in terms of artsy ambition. Tunes like "Judy Teen" and "Love's a Prima Donna" may have been poppy enough to sail into the English singles charts, but they also boasted unconventional instrumentation and poetic lyrics with lots of surreal, Bob Dylan-esque wordplay. The result was a string of intelligent yet catchy singles, all of which are compiled on this collection. Greatest Hits also includes a generous array of album favorites, and highlights Harley's oft-underrated skill with ballads. The only real downside is that its surprisingly short track list omits some early gems: the compilers could have easily thrown in another two or three songs to fully flesh out the track selection. Despite this quibble, Greatest Hits is a fine collection and makes a great introduction to this group's ambitious, artsy style of pop."

References

Steve Harley & Cockney Rebel albums
1987 greatest hits albums
EMI Records compilation albums
Glam rock compilation albums